Eulima perspicua is a species of sea snail, a marine gastropod mollusk in the family Eulimidae.

Distribution
This marine species is endemic to New Zealand

References

 Spencer, H.G., Marshall, B.A. & Willan, R.C. (2009). Checklist of New Zealand living Mollusca. pp 196–219 in Gordon, D.P. (ed.) New Zealand inventory of biodiversity. Volume one. Kingdom Animalia: Radiata, Lophotrochozoa, Deuterostomia. Canterbury University Press, Christchurch

External links
 To World Register of Marine Species

perspicua
Gastropods of New Zealand
Gastropods described in 1915